Floriade is a flower and entertainment festival held annually in Canberra's Commonwealth Park on the shores of Lake Burley Griffin. It features extensive displays of flowering bulbs with integrated sculptures and other artistic features. Floriade comes from the Latin word , which means to design with flowers.

The festival attracts tourists from around Australia and overseas in spring from mid September to mid October each year, and is considered the most important regular event for tourism in the Australian Capital Territory. It is also called "Australia's Celebration of Spring". After some controversy regarding an entry charge, admission to Floriade has been free for a number of years. When the main event at Commonwealth Park was cancelled due to the COVID-19 pandemic in 2020, the plants were instead placed at over 100 separate sites across Canberra in an event dubbed Floriade: Reimagined. A similar flower distribution is planned for 2021 after the event was again cancelled.

History

Origin
Floriade was the idea of Christiaan Slotemaker de Bruine, Landscape Architect with the Department of Capital Territory in Canberra. He commenced the design in 1986 and based it on the world famous 'Keukenhof' garden in The Netherlands. He orchestrated the construction with Peter Sutton, Holticulturist and Manager of Commonwealth Garden. He arranged the marketing, sculptures, live music, the purchase of bulbs, entertainment, lifting of bulb quarantine quotas as well as the design. Together with Sutton, they built the design on the Site of Commonwealth Park with the help of City Parks staff.
The design concept was 'multiculturalism of the Nation' and included Dutch and Aboriginal floral layouts. de Bruine obtained sponsorship from the Embassy of the Netherlands and the Bicentennial Authority. Sutton and de Bruine continued their successful partnership during the next two years, 1989 and 1990.

Chronology
Floriade started in 1988 as a one off celebration of Canberra's 75th birthday and Australia's Bicentenary of European settlement. Due to the success and popularity of the event it has run with a new theme every year, although in 2020 the centralised event was cancelled due to the COVID-19 pandemic. 

In 2020 due to the cancellation of the Commonwealth Park event, scheduled for 12 September to 11 October, the one million bulbs and annuals that would typically be on display were distributed over 130 different sites to create a Tulip Trail through Canberra's suburbs and city for Floriade: Reimagined. Around 300,000 of the plants were distributed to community groups and organisations, not-for-profits, sporting clubs, schools and early learning centres, as well as residents’ groups across Canberra.
 
In 2021 Floriade was again cancelled, on 21 August. Flowers that were to be displayed in Commonwealth Park will again be distributed around Canberra as they were in 2020.

Name

When the first festival was announced in 1987, the word "floriade" was said to mean "to decorate with floral designs". 
According to a later version, "floriade" comes from a Latin verb form "floreat" which is derived from "floreo" meaning "to be decked or covered with flowers". Thus, "Floriade" means "let it bloom".

In September 2005 ACT tourism authorities considered legal action over a trademark violation with Hunter Valley Gardens in New South Wales, who had renamed their annual floral festival to Floriade Hunter Valley Gardens. The term Floriade was replaced with Festival of Flowers in 2006.

Public art and culture
Floriade gives expression to public art, each year commissioning works which are placed in the Floriade gardens. Some remain beyond the festival. Floriade also showcases musical displays with many live performances, cultural celebrations, artistic displays, entertainment and recreational activities.

Floriade has also held a gnome decorating competition and display for several years, with strong participation from schools, aged people's homes, and businesses. 

For the first competition in 2000, 5'000 gnomes were mass produced and sold to raise funds for Koomari at a price of $5 each. The gnome known as Stanley Patches winning the first competition is stored at the Canberra Museum and Gallery.

Since 2005 the Floriade Gnome Gnoll has been managed by the Rotary Club of Canberra East, with proceeds going to local and overseas activities.  The 2005 theme of Rock 'n Roll only accentuated the regular theme of decorating gnomes as the members of bands. Examples shown below are the Australian children's entertainers, The Wiggles, in this case renamed The Gniggles, and the crowd favourite, KISS submitted by Weetangera Primary School.

Floriade themes
 

 1988 Floriade (multiculturalism)
 1989 Floriade (insects)
 1990 Floral garlands, champagne bubbles and floral river
 1991 Music
 1992 The art of horticulture
 1993 Kites, colour and movement
 1994 Reflections
 1995 Carnival of cultures
 1996 Floriade celebrates the arts
 1997 Colour by day and night
 1998 Gardens and gourmets
 1999 Magic of the gardens

 2000 Games in the garden
 2001 The Century in bloom (Celebrating Centenary of Federation)
 2002 Poetry in flowers
 2003 The heavens in bloom
 2004 The wonder of water
 2005 Rock 'n' roll in bloom
 2006 Carnivale – The World on Show
 2007 Aussie icons, myths and legends
 2008 Films that shaped the nation
 2009 Mind, Body and Soul
 2010 Imagination

 2011 A feast for the senses
 2012 Style & Design
 2013 Canberra Centenary
 2014 Embrace Passion
 2015 World War I remembrance
 2016 Life in Bloom
 2017 Carnival of Cultures
 2018 Pop Culture
 2019
 2020 Centralised event not held

Floriade NightFest 
From 1989 to the late 90s, "Floriade by Night" featured night time food, lighting displays, stalls and entertainment. It ran over several nights and was free. Night opening returned in 2008, now called NightFest, as a paid ticketed event. It includes live music, comedy and acrobatics performances, shopping, cocktails and movies.

Budget, attendance and economic return
It is the largest flower festival in the Southern Hemisphere, with over 300,000 visitors each year. In 2018 over 480,000 attended, and in 2019 there was record attendance of over 507,000, beating the prior 2014 record of nearly 482,000.

There is no entry fee to the festival. The plans to introduce one in 1998 lead to an outrage and ultimately failed.

Visitors to Floriade in 2013 spent close to $40 million. In 2019, when the festival was last held in-person, it brought over $44 million to the ACT economy.

The 2020 cancellation was said by Chief Minister Andrew Barr to have cost the local economy A$35-45 million of visitor income..

See also
 Floriade in the Netherlands
 Keukenhof annual flower festival in the Netherlands
 Spring Festival
 List of festivals in Australia

References

External links

Official Floriade page
Floriade 2014

Events in Canberra
Festivals in Australian Capital Territory
Recurring events established in 1988
1988 establishments in Australia
Annual events in Australia
Flower festivals in Australia
Spring (season) events in Australia
Garden festivals in Australia